Steven Weber is a professor at the School of Information and the Department of Political Science at the University of California, Berkeley. After studying history and international development at Washington University in St. Louis, he received an M.D. and a Ph.D in political science from Stanford University.

He is the author of several books about international politics and economics. He is also the editor of Globalization and the European Political Economy (Columbia University Press, 2000). Perhaps his most well-known book is The Success of Open Source, on the economy and motivations behind open source and free software. There he proposes the concept of anti-rival goods.

References

Books
 Cooperation and Discord in U.S.—Soviet Arms Control (Princeton Press, 1991)
 The Success of Open Source (Harvard University Press, 2004)

External links
 Video Interview (Webcast)
 Homepage at Berkeley

Year of birth missing (living people)
Living people
American political scientists
University of California, Berkeley School of Information faculty
Washington University in St. Louis alumni
Stanford University School of Humanities and Sciences alumni